Frank Aendenboom (24 October 1941 – 31 March 2018) was a Belgian actor. He appeared in more than sixty films since 1960.

Selected filmography

References

External links 

1941 births
2018 deaths
Flemish male film actors
Actors from Antwerp